William S. Robinson was an American football coach. He served as the head football coach at Detroit College—now known as the University of Detroit Mercy—for four seasons, from 1896 to 1899, compiling a record of 16–4.

Head coaching record

References

Year of death missing
Year of birth missing
Detroit Titans football coaches